Street racing is typically an unsanctioned and illegal form of auto racing that occurs on a public road. Racing in the streets is considered an ancient hazard, as horse racing occurred on streets for centuries, and street racing in automobiles is likely as old as the automobile itself. It became especially prevalent during the heyday of hot rodding (60s), muscle cars (70s), Japanese imports (90s), and sports cars (2000s). Since then, it continues to be both popular and hazardous, with deaths of bystanders, passengers, and drivers occurring every year. In the United States, modern street racing traces its roots back to Woodward Avenue, Michigan, in the 1960s when the three main Detroit-based American car companies were producing high-powered performance cars. Since a private racing venue was not always available, street races would be held illegally on public roads.

Though typically taking place in uncrowded highways on city outskirts or in the countryside, some races are held in large industrial complexes. Street racing can either be spontaneous or well planned and coordinated. Well-coordinated races are planned in advance and often have people communicating via two-way radios or citizens' band radio, and using police scanners and GPS units to mark locations where local police are more prevalent. Opponents of street racing claim street races have a lack of safety relative to sanctioned racing events, as well as legal repercussions arising from incidents, among street racing's drawbacks. Street racing is distinct from the legal and governed sport of drag racing; see terminology below.

Types

Car meets
In its simplest form, "car meets" can be described as gatherings by car enthusiasts and street racers alike with the sole purpose of taking their passions into the public eye. This can often mean something like a large abandoned parking lot, a sizeable location they specifically asked for permission to use, or other locations that are known to be car enthusiast-friendly where they are welcomed. While some car meets may involve street racing, many meets may recommend not to race at all during the meets. This is usually to prevent getting the attention of local law enforcement, as meets can easily gain attention. Some car meets are held at closed circuits such as Sonic Automotive circuits (Atlanta Motor Speedway and Charlotte Motor Speedway host such events during the year.)

Tōge racing

The sport of drifting and tōge (also transcribed touge) racing, primarily from Japan, has led to its acceptance in other parts of the world. Tōge – Japanese for "mountain pass", because these races are held on mountain roads and passes – generally refers to racing, one car at a time or in a chase format, through mountain passes (the definition of which varies per locale and racing organization). Examples of such roads include Del Dios Highway in Escondido, California; Genting Sempah in Malaysia; Highway 35; Some portions of British Columbia Highway 1 such as the Malahat drive; and Mount Haruna, on the island of Honshū, in Japan. However, street racing competition can lead to more people racing on a given road than would ordinarily be permitted (hence leading to the reputation of inherent danger).

Touge races, sometimes called Battles, are typically run at night between 2 cars in either "Cat and mouse" or Initial D rules. A series of matches are run with a lead and a chase driver starting either side by side or bumper to bumper at the starting point. If the lead driver manages to create a noticeable gap (also called pulling a gap) between their car and the chase driver by the finish line, he is determined the winner of the match. If the chase driver manages to stay on his opponent's tail, or passes the lead driver to cross the finish line first, he wins the match instead. In the second match, the trailing driver takes the front place and the winner is determined using the same method. If each driver wins one match, sometimes a sudden death match ensues via coin toss to determine the lead position. Sometimes sudden death matches are used when there is not sufficient time to run another 2 matches, or if a driver pleads that his equipment cannot handle the rigour of another round. Whoever wins a sudden death match wins the race. Using Initial D rules, if a driver crashes they lose the race and there are no sudden death matches. If not using Initial D rules, then a crash may mean only losing the match, not just the race. As with all street racing, there are no official rules and any advantage that a competitor has may be used as long as the challenging party agrees to the race.

Not all Touge races are Battles. Groups of street racers may meet up for club runs, exhibition, test runs or fun runs without determining winners or losers.

Sprints
"Sprints", also called "cannonball runs", are illegal point-to-point road rallies that involve a 2 or more racers.  They hearken back to the authorized European races at the end of the 19th century. The races died away when the chaotic 1903 Paris–Madrid race was canceled at Bordeaux for safety reasons after numerous fatalities involving drivers and pedestrians. Point-to-point runs reappeared in the United States in the mid-1910s when Erwin George Baker drove cross-country on record breaking runs that stood for years, being legal at the time. The term cannonball was coined for him in honor of his runs. Nowadays drivers will race from one part of a town or country to the other side; whoever makes the fastest overall time is the winner. A perfect example of an illegal road race was the 1970s original Cannonball Baker Sea-To-Shining-Sea Memorial Trophy Dash, also known as "The Cannonball Run", that long-time automotive journalist Brock Yates founded. The exploits spawned numerous films, the best known being The Cannonball Run.  Several years after the notorious "Cannonball", Yates created the family-friendly and somewhat legal version One Lap of America where speeding occurs in race circuits and is still running to this day.

In modern society it is rather difficult if not impossible to organize an illegal and extremely dangerous road race, but there are still a few events which may be considered racing, such as the Gumball 3000, Gumball Rally, and Players Run races. These "races", better known as rallies for legality's sake, mostly comprise wealthy individuals racing sports cars across the country for fun. The AKA Rally, however, is designed for individuals with a smaller budget (approximately $3,000). Entrance fees to these events are usually all-inclusive (hotels, food, and events). Participants "rally" together from a start point to predetermined locations until they arrive at the finish line. The AKA Rally in particular has organized driver-oriented events, e.g. autocross or drag strip races, away from public roads to minimize the risk of drivers getting too enthusiastic on public roads. The latter racing community has even spawned numerous TV and video series including the Mischief film series and Bullrun reality TV show. The AKA Rally was featured on MTV in a 2004 episode of True Life and was filmed in 2008 for a six-part series on the Speed TV network. Numerous games are based on the cannonball run type race, most famously Sega's OutRun arcade game.  It was also parodied in the 1960s–1970s Hanna-Barbera series Wacky Races.

Circuits
Circuit racing is a common alternate term for race track, given the circuit configuration of most race tracks, allowing races to occur any number of laps. A street circuit is a motorsport racing circuit composed of temporarily closed-off public roads of a city, town or village, used in motor races. Facilities such as the paddock, pit boxes, fences and grandstands are usually placed temporarily and removed soon after the race is over but in modern times the pits, race control and main grandstands are sometimes permanently constructed in the area. Since the track surface is originally planned for normal speeds, race drivers often find street circuits bumpy and lacking grip. Run-off areas may be non-existent, which makes driving mistakes more expensive than in purpose-built circuits with wider run-off areas. Racing on a street circuit is also called "legal street racing" with two or more racers involved. Local governments sometimes support races held in street circuits to promote tourism.

Legally sanctioned events

Most often, street racers bring their racers to a sanctioned track. This may occur when very fast cars are pairing up and racers or gamblers or both do not want the outcome of the race to be determined by the conditions of the racing surface, since public roadways do not usually offer the well prepared surface of the sanctioned track. These racers still consider themselves to be street racers since this type of one-on-one racing is not usually contested in sanctioned racing classes, especially if the race involves the common street race type handicaps (as seen in bracket racing). Such races are usually referred to as "grudge races", which are frequently organised in regularly scheduled events at the drag strip ("Test and Tune" days).  In some instances, the race track shuts off the scoreboard that typically would display the racer's performance numbers. Many street-style racers organize entire events at a legally sanctioned tracks:

No Time

The track's timing equipment is shut off and info on the car's performance is only displayed to track personnel for the purpose of enforcing safety rules. Often, even the racer does not know their elapsed time or terminal velocity until the official time slip is handed to the driver at the end of the race. These races typically have cars that are loosely separated into one or more classes based on the types of modifications they have, and are run heads up (no handicaps) in a traditional drag racing eliminator format until the winner is determined.

No Prep

The track surface is not treated with PJ1 Trackbite or other chemicals it would normally be for a traditional event, and sometimes the clocks are turned off (except for the officials and the time slip). The purpose of a no prep race is to simulate the marginal track surface conditions typically found on public roadways.  Racers who prefer this type of event typically do so because it allows the competitors to show that their cars could actually be competitive on a public roadway without the need to risk racing on the street.  However, this can be controversial.  In 2012, the FIA European Drag Racing Championship cancelled championship status at the Hockenheimring round after Formula One authorities demanded all treatment be sandblasted off the entire drag strip as Formula One teams could use the launch pad area (which doubles as the runoff headed to the final turn of the road course) to gain traction in an advantageous way.  The track effectively became "no prep" at the drag racing meet weeks later, and after numerous complaints about the no-prep surface the event was run without championship status.

Roll Race

The cars are typically up to 100 meters (110 yards) behind the start line when a signal is given for the cars to go.  The cars roll past the Christmas tree at  past the timing beams to start the race.  This form of drag racing on land is similar to drag boat racing on water.

Instant Green

The Christmas Tree is programmed, once both cars are staged, to skip the yellow light countdown and immediately turn on the green light when the computer activates the start sequence randomly after both cars are staged.  This is similar to "stop light" drag racing where street racers left on the traffic light turning green.

Street Drag

A standard drag race between any two street-legal vehicles to be the first to cross a set finish line. The race follows a short, straight course from a standing start over a measured distance, most commonly 1⁄4 mi (1,320 ft; 402 m), with a shorter (1,000 ft; 305 m) distance becoming increasingly popular, as it has become the standard for Top Fuel dragsters and funny cars, where some major bracket races and other sanctioning bodies have adopted it as the standard. The 1⁄8 mi (660 ft; 201 m) is also popular in some circles, often with slicks prohibited, mandating DOT-spec tires, on the drag strip.

Street Drift

Street drifting is a driving technique where the driver intentionally oversteers, with loss of traction, while maintaining control and driving the car through the entirety of a corner. The technique causes the rear slip angle to exceed the front slip angle to such an extent that often the front wheels are pointing in the opposite direction to the turn (e.g. car is turning left, wheels are pointed right or vice versa, also known as opposite lock or counter-steering). The sport of drifting is not to be confused with the four wheel drift, a classic cornering technique established. Drifting is traditionally done by clutch kicking, then intentionally oversteering and countersteering.

This event is often held on a road course, a skid pad located at the drag strip, or an oval circuit with an infield road course or Figure 8 crossover to create a drifting circuit.  Legally sanctioned events such as Formula Drift and D1GP are commonplace.

Terminology 
Globally, an "official" lexicon of street racing terminology is difficult to establish as terminology differs by location. Examples of this diversity can be found in the various words utilized to identify the illegal street racers themselves, including hoonigan and boy-racer (New Zealand and Australia), tramero (Spain), hashiriya (Japan), and mat rempit (Malaysia).

Terms common to the United States and other English-speaking countries include:

Nitrous Oxide System – A system in which the oxygen required for burning fuel stems from the decomposition of nitrous oxide (N2O) rather than air, which increases an engine's power output by allowing fuel to be burned at a higher-than-normal rate. Other terms used include the juice, the squeeze, the bottle, and NOS.

Pottstown or Potts Race – When two cars drag race through two or more traffic lights until the losing car stops at a traffic signal. This was popular in the 1980s in the town of Pottstown, Pennsylvania, until the borough reduced commonly used streets to a single lane in an effort to deter the practice.

Big Tire race – Two cars that race with a set of tires taller than 28.5 inches tall and or wider than 12.5 inches of tread. Typically this term is used in reference to the rear tires of cars used in straight line racing, and refers to a car that has modifications to the rear framer rails and suspension system to allow the large tires to fit under the car, but sometimes low-budget racers will simply cut the body panels of the car and allow the large tires to extend beyond the body width of the car. Cutting the body is a modification that is considered substandard and if often done to falsely make a car look like it is not built well in the hope of convincing other racers that the car is not very fast, with the hopes the other racers will offer a handicap start.  Such rules are also used in legitimate drag racing as classes of cars.

Small Tire race – Two cars that race with a set cars with tires smaller than or equal to 28.5 in and or equal 12.5 in of tread. This type of racing usually assumes that the rear frame rails and suspension are not radically modified. Small tires limit how much power the car can apply to the ground. There are also legally-sanctioned races that separate cars into classes based on tire size and chassis modifications. There are even entire legally sanctioned racing events limited to only small tire cars and cars that use DOT approved legal tires rather than racing slicks.  Such rules are also used in legitimate drag racing as classes of cars.

David versus Goliath – When a large tire car races a small tire car.

A dig may refer to all participants toeing a line, aligning the front tire of the vehicles, after which all vehicles race from a stop to a prearranged point (typically a quarter-mile in the United States, but may vary by locale).

A roll generally refers to a race which starts at a non-zero speed, and continues until all but one participant has stopped racing. This may be accompanied by three honks which would be analogous to a countdown.

To be set out lengths is a system of handicapping that allows a perceived slower car to start their race a number of car lengths ahead and requiring the perceived faster car to catch up and pass the slower car. There are often heated negotiations to determine a fair number.  This would be analogous to the bracket racing handicap start format used where one car has a head start over the other.  Some drag strips offer such street racing style events.

To get the "go", jump, break, hit, kick, or move is to start the race without the flagger. This is another system of handicapping that requires one car to wait until they see the other car start to move before they are allowed to leave their starting line.  In legitimate drag strips that run street racing style events, a jump is used for a red light foul if the Christmas Tree is used.

Another handicap that can be offered, especially in short distance straight races is called "the get off" or "the clear". This stipulation means that at the finish line the rearmost part of the car offering this handicap must be clearly ahead of the frontmost part of the car that is receiving it in order for the front car to be considered the winner. It offers nothing more than the equivalent of one car giving the other a single car length on the starting line, but sometimes makes it appear as if the car giving this handicap is offering something additional to other handicaps.

Another handicap is called "the back tire stage" which means that the car getting this handicap can put its rear tire on the starting line while the car giving it must put their front tires on the starting line.

The Break, the Clear and the Back tire stage are handicaps that can be offered alone or together when racing on the street, but are also compatible when this type of racing is done at a sanctioned racetrack since sanctioned tracks do not always have the means of offering other types of handicaps to street racers who are looking to carry out a street type race at the sanctioned track.

When the back tire stage, the break and the clear are all offered from one racer to another in a single pair type race it is sometimes referred to as the giver saying that they are offering "everything in racing" to their potential competitor. Such language is typically used in front of a large spectator crowd to shame the potential recipient into agreeing to race. It is all about "the hustle". (see below)

A flashlight start occurs when the start of the race is signaled by a flagger turning on a flashlight.  At legitimate drag strips with street racing programs, this may be simulated with instant green (where the yellow lights on the Christmas tree are not used; once the cars are staged, a delay may be used, then the green light only is turned on).

In addition to the people racing, there are generally observers present at organized street races. A flagger starts the race; this is typically accomplished by standing in front of the vehicles and making an up-down motion with the arms indicating the race should begin, waving a green flag (which was the case in the early drag races before the development of the Christmas Tree), or flashing a flashlight. There are variations on this theme, including the throwing/dropping of a handkerchief, ribbon, and so on. This act would be analogous to the Christmas Tree in a typical sanctioned drag race, and has been portrayed widely in popular culture, from ZZ Top music videos to American cinema.

Motivations
There are various motivations for street racing, but typically cited reasons include:
 Generally, street racing is not sanctioned and thus leads to a less rigorously controlled environment than sanctioned racing, to the enjoyment of some participants.
 Street racing is cited as an activity which is available to people who are otherwise under-age for entertainment at traditional venues such as bars.
 A community generally forms around the street racing "scene", providing social interaction among the participants and cliques therein.
 The opportunity to show off one's vehicle
 The simple and uncomplicated excitement of racing without the entry fees, rules, and politics typical of the sport.
 The excitement of racing when law enforcement is certain to give chase.
 A lack of proper, sanctioned racing venues in the locale. Most areas have little to no racing circuits themselves, and few get built due to complaints about noise from neighbours. This is especially problematic in urban and suburban areas.
 Street races are sometimes wagered on, either by the participants or observers. This is the origin of the term "racing for pink slips" (which means that the winner keeps the opponent's car), which inspired the 2005 Speed Channel series Pinks and is the primary wager shown in The Fast and The Furious films. This, in real life, seldom happens; most wagers involve cash (as in "Pinks: All Out").
 To settle a bet, dispute, etc. between fellow racers (ex. one believes that they are the better racer, both racers are vying for the same woman's affections, etc.).
 The variation of road layouts. Public roads offer far longer, varied and interesting tracks for racing. Especially winding country roads and hill passes that may provide changes in elevation and camber that are not available on most tracks.
Many street racers, particularly those involved in measured distance quarter or eighth mile racing, consider the sport to be about "the hustle". This could be considered similar to how people like pool sharks or card sharks operate. Basically, each racer will try to downplay how fast their own car really is by using methods of concealing special equipment that other racers might use to judge how fast the car really is. Racers who do this are usually trying to get a handicapped start from a potential opponent, such as the above-mentioned car lengths or starting line "leave".  Many such racers will also instigate heated arguments during these negotiations in an effort to confuse or otherwise shame their opponent into offering a handicap term that they might not normally offer. Even in this type of racing there is an honor code. Most racers will consider it cheating if a racer blatantly lies about any part or potential of their own car, even if they were not specifically asked about it. If a racer is specifically asked if they have a part, or modification, or are asked about their engine size, they should answer truthfully. Acceptable lies are often lies of omission. An example of a lie of omission might be when a racer is asked about their engine and replies that they have a "small block engine".  Small block engines come in many sizes and configurations, and unless the prospective opponent asks for other information about the engine, they would be left to guess on the engine's potential. A blatant lie would be for a racer to specifically say that they do not have nitrous oxide or other modification or specifically mention horsepower or weight numbers that are inaccurate. Discovery of blatant lies could cause very heated arguments, especially when gambling is involved, and a racer who is caught in the lie is almost always forced to pay up on the bet.

Bets on races often involve "a pot", which means that multiple people have their money betting on one of the cars. A pot allows betters to gamble an amount that they are comfortable with rather than having to find a bettor who wants to gamble exactly the same amount. At the start of the actual race the total pot amounts must be even on each car, which sometimes limits the size of the pot on the more popular car if the less popular car cannot get an equally large pot. Races are often set up in advance, especially when high bets are at stake. Races that are set up in advance may have a "DP" or "punk out money" arranged in advance, which is usually 10 percent of the potential pot, and if one racer fails to show up at the agreed race time the DP is forfeited.  Some racers may agree that if one racer leaves the line early or does something that is agreed as unacceptable during the actual race, only the DP money is lost, but that is not always the case. Sometimes the rule is that "if you chase, it is a race", meaning that if one racer jumps and the other racer follows, it is a legitimate race. Another example would be that once a racer leaves the line, even if he jumped, he is considered to have left the line, and if he attempts to back up or simply slow down, he is still considered to have started his race, and the other racer has the right to leave the line at any time and the race is legitimate. So, it is wise for a racer who jumped to continue driving all the way to the finish line. These are considered universal rules among many serious street racers no matter where in the world the race is held.

Dangers
Dangers can include serious injury, legal consequences, and death. Since 2000, at least 179 people have been killed in street racing–related accidents in Los Angeles.

Additional dangers provided by the Kent, Washington police department are as follows.

 Traffic collisions, including fatalities
 Trespassing on private property
 Auto theft rates
 Public property damage in case of a collision
 Possibility of gang conflicts, terrorism, murder, gambling, or other crimes, especially when street racing is associated with organized crime or street gangsters.

Because vehicles used in street racing competitions generally lack professional racing safety equipment such as roll cages and racing fuel cells, and drivers seldom wear fire suits and are not usually trained in high-performance driving, injuries and fatalities are common results from accidents. Furthermore, illegal street racers may put ordinary drivers at risk because they race on public roads rather than closed-course, purpose-built facilities, such as Pacific Raceways in the aforementioned city.

Because racing occurs in areas where it is not sanctioned, property damage (torn up yards, signs and posts being knocked down from accidents) and damage to the fences or gates closing an area off (industrial parks, etc.) can occur. As the street racing culture places a very high social value on a fast vehicle, people who might not otherwise be able to afford blazingly fast but very expensive vehicles may attempt to steal them, violently or otherwise. Additionally, street racers tend to form teams which participate in racing together; the implication above is that these teams may be a form of organized crime or gang activity.  In addition, those who race illegally on public roads may have their competition licence suspended, revoked, or be prohibited from obtaining such, per Automobile Competition Committee for the United States policy (includes the NHRA), on personal conduct charges that include racing on a public road.

Furthermore, a street racing associated by gang activity or other organized crimes may often use violence or other crimes, such as gambling. In addition, a crime-associated street racing may be linked to prostitution, often offered as a "prize" for the winning competitor, as well as extensive gambling.

Types of racers 
The predominant age range that participate in racing are those aged between 16 and 25. Male minorities that come from mid to lower social class are more likely to partake in street racing. Results from a survey of 2,395 street racers showed that 33% did not own a driving license and that 14% had been involved in a crash. Crashes usually happen during the night or in the early morning. Street racing is only a small fraction of car crashes. The urge for educational programs to teach people about the negatives of risky driving can minimize the rate of street racing. By doing so, this can help lower the rate of crashes by teenagers.

By country

Africa

Nigeria
Dec 27, 2021 police arrested rich kids who were doing illegal street racing in Abuja.  Due to illegal street racing a part of a popular road in Abuja has been cited as a racing spot by racers.

South Africa
Illegal street racing in South Africa has been a problem for a long time mostly in Cape Town.  This act causes an outrage on the local communities due to noise, accidents, etc. The authorities develops measures to be taken to address illegal street racing.

Americas

Brazil
In Brazil, street races are commonly known as "pegas" or "rachas". Since 1997, the National Traffic Code of Brazil prohibits street racing, stunts, dangerous moves and related competitions in public streets; racers may have their driving licenses and cars confiscated, besides paying a fine and going to jail from six months to two years. Popular street racing venues are often discovered by police after receiving information from Crime Stoppers. In such cases, plainclothes officers are first sent to check if the information is correct. If so, the roads leading out of the place are blocked and the competitors arrested.

Legal amateur racing is possible in some places. For example, Autódromo José Carlos Pace, the venue for the Formula 1 Brazilian Grand Prix, hosts regular amateur racing events with appropriate infrastructure. Some racecourses have events such as track days or drag racing with cars split into categories by power.

Canada
A driver convicted of a causing a street racing fatality can be sentenced to life imprisonment as a maximum term, with full parole possible after serving 7 years in prison. A driver convicted of injuring another person in the course of a street race is subject to a prison term of at most 14 years.Every one commits an offence who operates... a motor vehicle in a manner that is dangerous to the public, having regard to all the circumstances, including the nature, condition and use of the place at which the motor vehicle is being operated and the amount of traffic that at the time is or might reasonably be expected to be at that place;

United States

There is a strong racing culture in California, particularly Southern California. It is considered to be the birthplace of North American drag racing. This area was covered in some depth by magazines such as Turbo and Hi-Tech Performance and Sport Compact Car in the late 1990s.

In some cases, this popularity has led to tough anti-street racing laws which give stricter punishments (including misdemeanors for attending race events) than normal traffic citations and also often involve dedicated anti-racing task forces. San Diego, in Southern California was the first US city to allow the arrest of spectators attending street races. Penalties for violating street racing laws can now include impoundment and possibly the destruction of the offending vehicle, the suspension or revocation of the offender's driver's license, or both.

Some police departments in the United States have also undertaken community outreach programs to work with the racing community to educate them to the dangers of street racing, as well as to encourage them to race in sanctioned events. This has also led to a campaign introduced in 2000 called Racers Against Street Racing (RASR), a grass-roots enthusiast group consisting of auto manufacturers, after-market parts companies, professional drag racers, sanctioning bodies, race tracks and automotive magazines devoted to promoting the use of safe and legal raceways as an alternative to street racing. Kent's Beat the Heat is a typical example of this type of program. Other such alliances have been forged in southern and central California, reducing the incidence of street racing there. Except San Diego, popular racing locations have been Los Angeles, Miami, Long Beach, Oakland, San Francisco, San Jose, Fort Lauderdale, Philadelphia, and the Seattle suburb of Kent, Washington.

Asia

China
The drivers, who drove a fleet of luxury sport cars including Ferraris, Lamborghinis and McLarens, were arrested at the border in Shenzhen trying to return to Hong Kong.

The law under which this arrest took place was enacted in 2010 after Hu Bin, a Hangzhou student, mounted the sidewalk in a street race, killing a pedestrian. A public outcry ensued, as Hu came from a wealthy family, while the victim was his family's sole income earner. Hu was sentenced to three years in prison and was fined 1.1 million yuan as well as an unspecified driving ban.

Japan
Street racers, known natively as hashiriya (走り屋), often run their cars on expressways and highways, where they are known as kōsoku battle or commonly known as Roulette-zoku as they drive round and round in circular motions and frequently occur on the Shuto Expressway in Tokyo. Japanese racers have also popularized racing along the narrow winding roads of the mountains of the country, known as touge (portrayed in the manga/anime series Initial D). The expressway racing scene is portrayed in the manga Wangan Midnight, as well as in the movie series Shuto Kousoku Trial.

The most notorious group to be associated with street racing was the Mid Night Club, who became world famous for their speeds, at times exceeding .

With heavier punishments, patrolling police cars, crackdowns in meeting areas and the installation of speed cameras, expressway racing in Japan is not as common today as it was during the 1980s and the 1990s. Still, it occurs on a not-so-regular basis. Persistent racers often install spring-assisted license-plate swivelling mechanisms that hold plates down at speed or picture-proof screens over their plates. In 2001, the amount of hashiriya dropped from 9,624 (in 1995) to 4,365 and police arrests in areas where hashiriya gather are common. Cars are checked for illegal modification and if found, owners are fined and forced to remove the offending modifications.

One of the causes of street racing in Japan is that, despite the fame and large number of race circuits, these circuits can become overcrowded.

As in other countries, street racing also occurs on long straights in industrial areas, which are used for drag races, known natively as Zero-Yon (ゼロヨン) for "0–400" (meters), Yon is Japanese for "4". This practice gave its name to the popular 1990s video game franchise, Zero4 Champ series.

Malaysia

Street racing in Malaysia is illegal, as is watching a street race; this is enforced by the Royal Malaysian Police. Many streets, roads, highways and expressways in Kuala Lumpur, Penang, Johor Bahru, and other cities or towns in the country have become sites for racing. Among the participants are teenagers driving modified cars or riding motorcycles.

Motorcycle street racers in Malaysia are known as Mat Rempit. These Mat Rempit are infamous for their "Superman" stunts and other feats performed on their motorcycles. 
They are also notorious for their "cilok", a kind of racing in which racers weave in-between moving and stationary traffic at high speed.

In addition to doing their stunts and racing around, they have a habit of causing public disorder. They usually travel in large groups and at times raid isolated petrol stations. They can cordon off normal traffic flow to allow their friends to race along a predetermined circuit.

Most illegal car racers in Malaysia use modified common cars or bargain performance cars. Some of the commonly used cars include national cars such as the Proton Wira, Proton Saga, Proton Perdana, Proton Satria, Proton Waja, Japanese cars like the first-generation Nissan Cefiro, Nissan Silvia, Mitsubishi Lancer Evolution, Subaru Impreza, Nissan GT-R, Nissan 180SX, Honda Integra, and Toyota AE86. High-performance cars such as Ferrari F430, BMW M3 E46, and Porsche Cayman have also been used. 

Illegal drift racing often takes place on dangerous hill roads such as Bukit Tinggi, Genting Highlands, Cameron Highlands or Teluk Bahang, Penang. Meanwhile, illegal drag racing takes place on expressways such as the Second Link Expressway in Johor Bahru. Illegal racers are subject to punishment by their over-modified vehicles which do not follow road regulations in Malaysia.

On 3 May 2009 the Bukit Aman Traffic Division of the Royal Malaysian Police, together with the Road Transport Department, once again launched a major integrated operation to crack down on both cars and Mat Rempit motorcycles involved in illegal racing. More than 115 motorcycles were impounded in the major operation which was held simultaneously in Kuala Lumpur, Selangor, Penang and Negeri Sembilan.

Turkey
In Turkey, street racing is illegal. Since the 1960s street racing has been a sub-culture of the Bağdat Avenue in Istanbul, where young wealthy men tag-raced their imported muscle cars. Most of these young men are now middle-agers reliving their years of excitement as famous professional rally or track racers. With the heightened GTI and hot hatch culture starting in the 1990s, street racing was revived in full. Towards the end of the 1990s, mid-night street racing caused many fatal accidents, which came to a minimum level due to intense police patrol.

Europe
Street racing in most European countries is illegal. The most common way of street racing is grip on mountain passes, especially in the north of Spain, with roads like Montseny, in Catalonia.

Germany
On 1 February 2016, two street racers disregarded several red lights and killed a 69-year-old pensioner, a father of two, when one of the drivers rammed his vehicle on the Kurfürstendamm in Berlin. In February 2017, the Landgericht Berlin sentenced the two drivers for collaborative murder, in the first murder conviction for street racers. The verdict was appealed to the Federal Court of Justice as it was not clear the drivers had driven with deadly intent or criminal negligence. The second trial was started over in August 2018 at which time the drivers had spent two years in detention. The second trial was annulled and a third trial started in November 2018. They were again convicted of murder in 2019. The verdict was again appealed to the Federal Court of Justice, who upheld the murder verdict against the main perpetrator in June 2020.

Greece
Street racing has been a sub-culture of Greece since the 1970s. Street racing became more organized in the 1980s, and gained public recognition during the 1990s and 2000s because of magazines like Max Power . The most popular spots in Attica are  Poseidonos Avenue, Vouliagmenis Avenue , Limanakia in Varkiza, Schisto in Keratsini , Kryfi in Marathonas , Periferiaki Aigaleou  and Syngrou Avenue. Other cities or regions like Thessaloniki also have a big street racing sub-culture but not to the extent of Athens because of their population.

Until the mid-1990s, the Greek police did not interfere in street racing; there have been reports of police officers taking part or spectating in them. That was about to change when Greek TV channel, Mega, showed a car crash in Limanakia. This completely changed street racing culture in Greece, as the police were forced to crack down on street racing. For that reason a police unit called Sigma squad was created in 1995 which drove high-end sports cars like the BMW M3, the Audi RS2 and the Porsche 930 turbo. The unit was dissolved in 2005 after various crashes and lack of funding.

The lack of race tracks (especially outside of Athens) and the massive popularity of cars and motorbikes are the main reasons why street racing is so popular.

Popular cars street racers use are the Citroen Saxo/Peugeot 106, Honda Civic, Volkswagen Golf, Seat Cupra and BMW 3 SERIES.A lot of people, especially those that are under the age of 18, street race using their modified underbone motorcycles. 

Even after decline because of the economic crisis, street racing continues to be popular in Greece.

Italy
Italy has a long tradition about street racing and tuned cars. In the 60s, a tuned Fiat 500 used to race on the highway near Parma, reaching a maximum speed of 180 km/h (~112 mph). In the 90s, street racing was very popular in Italy. In Rome, street racers used to conduct car meetups near the Marconi Obelisk and race on the local highways. The movie Maximum Velocity (V-Max), was inspired by these events and is a cult classic among Italian car enthusiasts.

Most of cars involved in these events were the infamous 'Bare con le ruote', which means 'coffin on wheels', such as the Fiat Punto GT, the Fiat Uno turbo, the Peugeot 106, the Renault Clio Williams and the Renault 5 Turbo. In the early 2000s, many people were seriously injured or killed during street races. In May 2000, two men driving a stolen BMW lost control of their vehicle during a street race and hit a large crowd, killing a 24-year-old woman. In October 2002, a man named Angelo Giugliano was killed after being hit by two cars involved in a street race in Rome.

In the 2010s, track days at the Autodromo Nazionale di Monza become more popular with car enthusiasts with burnouts in the tunnel attracting many spectators. Many cars performing burnouts are streetracing vehicles. In the late 2010s and early 2020s legal car meetings become popular in Italy. Injuries are still prevalent, such as the BMW driver who hit a crowd and injured some people in Turin in November 2018. Street racing is still popular in Italy, and can divided into highway street racers and Tōge racers.

Modern hot hatches such as Abarth 500 and Ford Fiesta ST are popular among street racers, but also 1990s and 2000s Japanese and French cars are very common, especially on narrow mountains touges, using Group N car parts and removing interior parts for saving some weight.

Albania 
Street racing has been a sub-culture of Albania since the 1990s following the collapse of communism. Street racing became more organized in the 2000s, and gained public recognition during the 2010s because of magazines like Max Power. The most popular spot are roads near Skanderbeg Square. Albanian street racers commonly use German & Italian Cars from the 80s, 90s & early 2000s

Portugal
In Portugal, street racing is illegal, but is still widely popular, mainly among teenagers and young adults between the ages of 18–30. The preferred sites for street racing are industrial areas, freeways, wide streets in the largest cities and expressways connecting locations around them. Areas where street racing is common usually have automatic speed cameras installed. The races are usually performed at night, when there are fewer drivers on the roads.

Despite the many efforts by the police against the threat, and according to sources from the Public Security Police and the Highway Patrol division of the National Guard, crimes related to street racing are still increasing, which led to the promulgation of a new law that allows one to be convicted of "homicide in the context of a street race" instead of only negligent homicide.

Since the races are now mainly scheduled through SMS and Internet forums, the police maintain a constant vigilance over street racing websites. Also, videos depicting street races on video hosting websites like YouTube help the police to identify locations and individuals and, eventually, prosecute them.

An association of speed-loving volunteers, called Superdrivers, fights for sanctioned racing events to happen every weekend and opposes street racing. They complain that legal racing is only available once or twice a year and under restricted conditions.

United Kingdom
Street racing in the United Kingdom is illegal under the Road Traffic Act 1988. The punishment for a conviction of motor racing and speed trials on public ways is a mandatory driving ban and a fine not exceeding £2,500.

The city of Birmingham has been described as the street racing capital of the United Kingdom.

Oceania

Australia
Street racing in Australia occurs across the country, most notably in certain suburbs of major cities and semi-rural New South Wales and Victoria. People who participate, specifically the drivers themselves, are referred to as hoons or 'boyracers' in New Zealand. The term is also used as a verb to describe reckless and dangerous driving in general ("to hoon" or "to hoon around").

Street racing began in the late 1960s as the local vehicle manufacturers (Ford Australia, Chrysler Australia and Holden) began creating performance versions of their family cars both for attracting the growing male youth market and meeting racing homologation requirements. Vehicles such as the Chrysler Valiant Pacer offered strong performance at an affordable price, while vehicles from Ford offered even stronger performance at an even more affordable price. While V8s were popular, most street-racers concentrated on tuning the locally designed and built Chrysler 265ci Hemi, Holden 202ci and Ford 250ci six-cylinder engines used in the Chrysler Valiant, Chrysler Valiant Charger, Holden Torana, Holden Monaro, Holden Commodore and Ford Falcon.

Laws exist in all states and territories that limit modifications done to vehicles and prohibit having nitrous oxide hooked up to, or even present inside a car. In most states and territories, P-Plater (Provisional Drivers) are not allowed to drive any vehicle with more than six cylinders as well as turbo. In most states further laws impose strong penalties for street racing such as confiscating or impounding the vehicle and loss of license.

Australia has lower reported levels of this behavior than New Zealand related to street racing, due in part to the size of the Australian continent and much of it occurring undetected in remote rural locations or at odd hours. Stricter rules have recently been imposed on safety features of imported cars, reducing the volume of small and cheap Japanese imports that are typically modified with loud exhaust tips and cut-down coil springs by boy racers.

New Zealand
New Zealand has strict rules on vehicle modifications and a registered engineer must audit any major modification and certify roadworthiness within a system known as the Low Volume Vehicle Technical Association. The LVVTA exists to service legal motorsport and responsible modifications only, but the system is prohibitively expensive and seems to be engineered to discourage hot rodding rather than promote it. Unofficial street racing remains illegal and police are well endowed with equipment to use, such as 'sustained loss of traction' which carries a minimum sentence of licence disqualification and maximum sentence of imprisonment. Street racing is common in New Zealand and there are many small clubs offering street racing in remote rural roads. Despite its popularity, rates of incident due to street racing in New Zealand are relatively low.

Popular media

Films
In the 1970s the movies American Graffiti and The Hollywood Knights played a key role in the expansion of street racing and the joy of owning a hot rod. This much later catapulted the highly successful film series The Fast and the Furious, which is based on street racing, although later Fast and Furious films starting with Fast Five transitioned the series to heists, and action, with fewer street races seen in the films. Redline also gives a significant overview of what street racing is.  Torque also gives an insight to the world of street racing, as shown in the beginning when the protagonist Cary Ford passes two street racers before going to a diner, although the movie is more about the use of high-performance motorbikes than cars. A documentary film, Speed and Mayhem Down Under, shows the real street racing scene in Australia. Also, in Japanese anime and manga series Initial D portrayed street racing in Japan, on touge.

Video games

One of the oldest and longest running street racing video game franchises is the Japanese Shutokou Battle series which has seen dozens of releases on a variety of platforms starting in 1994 on the Super Famicom. It is known in NTSC-U and PAL territories with names such as Tokyo Xtreme Racer, Tokyo Highway Challenge, Street Supremacy or Import Tuner Challenge, and takes inspiration from Wangan and Tōge racing as well as track racing.

The street racing video game series Midnight Club has been very successful in the market and is available on many platforms. This series includes the first title Midnight Club for the PlayStation 2 and Game Boy Advance; Midnight Club II for the PlayStation 2, PC and Xbox; and Midnight Club 3: DUB Edition for the PlayStation 2, Xbox and then later released on the PlayStation Portable. Midnight Club 3: DUB Edition Remix was later released for the PlayStation 2 and Xbox. Midnight Club: Los Angeles was the first of the series to be released on seventh generation video game consoles.

Several missions in the popular Grand Theft Auto video game series see the player participating in races on the city streets. While a few are mandatory, most are offered as side-missions that the player can undertake to earn money. Some of these missions often involve vehicular combat in addition to regular street racing, with the player required to attack opponents via drive-by shooting, in order to damage their vehicles or kill the opposing driver.

The Need for Speed series originally started on the 3DO system in 1994. Although the earlier games were noted for daytime racing on public roads with high-performance cars of their times, several later titles affiliated with street racing, which came out after the Midnight Club series was established, after Midnight Club II in particular. Among them, the Underground series (encompassing Need for Speed: Underground and Need for Speed: Underground 2), takes place at night in various urban areas, but lacks any police to pursue the player. Need for Speed: Most Wanted reintroduces police pursuit into gameplay and is set in daytime. It also draws controversy by encouraging the player to damage police cars by any means necessary to acquire bounty. The next Need for Speed title, Need for Speed: Carbon sees the return of night time racing and features police pursuits, although not mandatory to damage police cars as in the previous installment. The 2007 Need for Speed title, Need for Speed: ProStreet has gotten rid of the illegal street racing, and is now entirely legal, closed-track races, with no police involvementmuch to the disappointment of some of the series' fans (and worse reviews by most video game reviewers). The next title, Need for Speed: Undercover, does return to illegal street racing and features gameplay similar to Most Wanted and Carbon. Unlike Most Wanted and Carbon, this time the plot involves an undercover police officer who is trying to break up an international crime ring; however, the game was very badly reviewed, and considered by many to be the low point of the series. Two Need for Speed titles, Need for Speed: Nitro and Need for Speed: World Online, also feature street racing, whereas Need for Speed: Shift again returns to legal racing, much like Need For Speed: ProStreet, but this time with much more emphasis on realism and driving style Precision or Aggression. Need for Speed (2015) returns the player to the streets, again in the night. Need for Speed: Heat is the latest entry in the franchise. Released on November 8, 2019, the game features legal, sanctioned races during the daytime, and illegal street racing during the night. The game also features a return of free-roaming police after their absence in previous entry, Need for Speed Payback.

The popular multi-platform (PlayStation 2, PlayStation 3, Xbox 360, Xbox, PSP, GameCube) series Burnout showcases fictional cars racing at high speed through traffic, with crashes rewarded by highly detailed slow motion destruction sequences. Later iterations include specific competition modes rewarding the largest monetary damage toll in specifically designed maps.

Another game that features street racing is Juiced by THQ. The game mentions that it was developed with the intention of giving the gamer the thrill of high-speed driving.

To meet commercial expectations, these games often compromise the realism of the car handling physics to give the user an easier gameplay experience. The greatest disparity is that most games have the player's vehicle being completely indestructible. This makes it possible to devise strategies that would be impossible in real life, such as using a wall to stop lateral velocity through a turnrather than picking an appropriate line.

The Cruis'n series is also associated with street racing. The 1994 arcade game Cruis'n USA has several references to street racing, like real cars and an upgrading system such as spoilers, decals, neon lights, ground effects, and engines. However unlike in Need For Speed, there is not a pursuit system nor car damage.

The classic arcade game, which is also for the Dreamcast, PS2, Gamecube, Xbox, PC, PSP, and GBA, Crazy Taxi, has similarities to an illegal street race. Players choose a driver and a convertible taxicab without any seat belts, car hood, or car windows, and get passengers to their destinations while driving as if taking part in illegal street races all over San Francisco, New York, and Las Vegas.

Several racetracks in the Mario Kart series involve street racing on a public road with traffic acting as hazards such as cars, buses, and trucks. The first game to include this feature is Mario Kart 64, and it has appeared at least once in subsequent games.

The Rush arcade racing games featured street racing in simplified versions of real-world cities with the first and third game taking place in San Francisco, California. The second game, however, had races in all sorts of cities all over the United States. These game did not feature any traffic to interfere with the race.

See also
 American Graffiti
 Boy racer (UK term)
 Car chase
 Car tuning
 Custom car
 The Hollywood Knights
 Hoon (Australian term)
 Import scene
 Midnight Club
 Need for Speed: The Run
 Tafheet
 Traffic stop

References

External links

 

Motorsport by type
Motor racing
Hazardous motor vehicle activities
Organized crime activity